This is a list of years in French television.

Twenty-first century

Twentieth century

See also 
 List of years in France
 Lists of French films
 List of years in television

Television
Television in France by year
French television